West Leyden is a hamlet in Lewis County, New York, United States. West Leyden has a post office with ZIP code 13489, which opened on December 16, 1826. Today West Leyden is home to approximately 250 residents, a grocery store/gas station, church, two restaurants, garbage company, Volunteer Fire and Ambulance Department and Elementary School.

References

Hamlets in Lewis County, New York
Hamlets in New York (state)